Minsk Zoo is located in a southeast part of Minsk near Svislach River.

Location and extent
Minsk Zoo is situated in the south-east part of Minsk in floodplain of the river Svisloch. According to the order of Minsk City Council of 2 March 2001, the territory with total area 42 hectares in frameworks of the streets Uborevicha, Tashkentskaya, Golodeda and Mashinostroiteley was allocated for the Minsk Zoo. From the southern part this area is bordered with large urban district Chyzhouka, from the north this territory is limited by industrial zone of Minsk Automobile Plant, in western direction – by Chizhovskoye water reservoir with recreation zone for the inhabitants of Chyzhouka.

History
The Minsk Zoo was established in 1984 by nature amateurs from the Minsk Automobile Plant. Its founder and the first manager was Fedor Revsin, an engineer and a designer of the Minsk Automobile Plant, also the chairman of the Nature Amateurs Club of the plant.  The first foster-children of the new Zoo were wild animals, which had found themselves in miserable condition (an injured white stork, swans, polluted with black oil in an industrial precipitation pond, young roes, small foxes and others).

The Zoo first opened to visitors, who were mostly Minsk inhabitants, on August 9, 1984. In 1994 the zoological garden acquired at last the status of the Minsk Municipal Zoo, as well as municipal subsidy for feeding animals. However, its development and capital construction were kept by municipal authorities due to various ecological factors: such as, the zoo was quite near to the industrial area of the plant, Chizhovka lake, its location in floodplain of the Svislach river.

Further development

In 2000 there was the decision of Minsk City Council made for further development of the Zoo along the floodplain of the Svislach. This 2nd line includes:

Exposition area of "South America" with a tropical pavilion and open enclosures, children’s zoo, also service and household buildings (booking office, entry control station, garages, store-houses). For the years 2003-2005 the municipal authorities have granted financial support for realization of these projects.

Animals
At present, the collection of animals of Minsk Zoo counts for 1343 mammals in 64 species, 213 birds in 47 species, 92 reptiles in 53 species, 19 amphibians in 6 species, 1927 invertebrates in 16 species (totally 3585 animals in 186 species).

International cooperation
Minsk Zoo is a full member of the Eurasian Regional Association of Zoos and Aquariums (EARAZA) since 1997.

External links
 Site of the Minsk zoo
 History of the Minsk zoo

Buildings and structures in Minsk
Zoo
Zoo
Zoos established in 1984
Articles needing infobox zoo